Sumner Township is a civil township of Gratiot County in the U.S. state of Michigan.  The population was 1,911 at the 2000 census.

Communities
The FIPS place code is 25580.
The FIPS place code is 77280 and the elevation is 764 feet above sea level.

Geography
According to the United States Census Bureau, the township has a total area of 35.9 square miles (93.1 km), of which 35.9 square miles (93.0 km) is land and 0.04 square mile (0.1 km) (0.11%) is water.

Demographics
As of the census of 2000, there were 1,911 people, 698 households, and 552 families residing in the township. There were 744 housing units at an average density of 20.7 per square mile (8.0/km). The racial makeup of the township was 97.59% White, 0.16% African American, 0.52% Native American, 0.05% Asian, 0.42% from other races, and 1.26% from two or more races. Hispanic or Latino of any race were 2.51% of the population.

There were 698 households, out of which 36.0% had children under the age of 18 living with them, 63.9% were married couples living together, 10.6% had a female householder with no husband present, and 20.8% were non-families. 15.0% of all households were made up of individuals, and 7.2% had someone living alone who was 65 years of age or older.  The average household size was 2.72 and the average family size was 2.98.

In the township the population was spread out, with 26.8% under the age of 18, 9.4% from 18 to 24, 28.2% from 25 to 44, 23.7% from 45 to 64, and 11.9% who were 65 years of age or older.  The median age was 36 years. For every 100 females, there were 99.9 males.  For every 100 females age 18 and over, there were 98.6 males.

The median income for a household in the township was $38,309, and the median income for a family was $42,216. Males had a median income of $30,833 versus $21,296 for females. The per capita income for the township was $16,034.  About 7.6% of families and 9.6% of the population were below the poverty line, including 8.1% of those under age 18 and 7.6% of those age 65 or over.

References

External links
Michigan's Smallest Post Office (Elm Hall)

Townships in Gratiot County, Michigan
Townships in Michigan